Overcasting is the process of broadcasting content that is meant to be played over and in sync with another piece of content.  For example, a forensics expert might create commentary for an episode of CSI and share that commentary independent of the original video.  The file containing the commentary, mixing information and synchronization data is called an overcast.

The term overcasting was coined in early 2005 by Richard Stoakley at Overcast Media.

See also 
 Broadcasting
 Overcast Media
 Overlay
 Podcasting

Interactive television